"Papercut" is a song by German DJ and record producer Zedd from his second studio album, True Colors which features vocals from Australian singer-songwriter Troye Sivan. It was written by Zedd, Julia Michaels, Sam Martin, Lindy Robbins, Jason Evigan and Austin Paul Flores and produced by Zedd. It was released as the third single on July 17, 2015.

Background
In an interview Zedd said: "I thought "Papercut" would probably be my least favorite song, actually, because it's so long and it's not very catchy. It's unconventional and has this long dip in the middle, which to me is like the movie moment where you close your eyes and see Inception or Interstellar. I love that kind of stuff but I thought people wouldn't."

"Papercut" was premiered at Zedd's True Colors Experience  on 10 May 2015 in Philadelphia, Pennsylvania. The listening session was held in Fonthill Castle, chosen to reflect the cinematic nature of the song.

Sivan revealed in a YouTube video on 29 June 2015 that he and Zedd didn't meet each other at all to do the song: "I just went into the studio one day and recorded the vocal and left...and that was it."

On 17 July 2015, Zedd uploaded the song audio onto his Vevo account, featuring an updated single cover. The song was chosen over "Bumble Bee" as the third single on his LP.

Critical reception
The song has received positive reviews from critics, who praised Sivan's vocals on the track. Nic Kelly from Project U wrote, "At the start, "Papercut" sounds like it could be a ballad. Then it sounds like it could be in Frozen. Then the beat kicks and Troye starts singing and it's exceptionally amazing," and said Sivan is "the perfect vocalist for this." Chris Haigh, from Pop Insomniacs, called the track a "highlight of the album" and "an impressive slice of house-pop helmed by Sivan's promising vocals". Glenn Gamboa, from Newsday, said the track is "a fascinating suite of synth-pop".

Track listing
Digital download
 "Papercut"  – 7:23
Grey Remix
 "Papercut"   – 3:34

Charts

References

2015 singles
2015 songs
Songs written by Lindy Robbins
Songs written by Jason Evigan
Songs written by Julia Michaels
Songs written by Sam Martin (singer)
Songs written by Zedd
Zedd songs
Troye Sivan songs
Interscope Records singles